Peregrine Poulett (10 December 1708 – 1752), of Hinton St. George, Somerset, was a British politician who sat in the House of Commons between 1737 and 1752.

Poulett was the second son of John Poulett, 1st Earl Poulett, MP, and his wife Bridget Bertie, daughter of Hon. Peregrine Bertie of Waldershare, Kent.
 
Poulett was returned as  Member of Parliament for Bossiney after a contested by-election on 24 May 1737. He voted with the Government on the Spanish convention in 1739 and the place bill in 1740. He did not stand at the 1741 British general election, but at the 1747 British general election, he   was brought in as MP for Bridgwater as a government supporter by his elder brother, Lord Poulett, in place of his younger brother, Vere, who had gone over to the Opposition.

Poulett died unmarried on  28 August 1752.

References

 

1708 births
1752 deaths
Members of the Parliament of Great Britain for English constituencies
British MPs 1734–1741
British MPs 1747–1754
Younger sons of earls